Horace Woodard (August 18, 1904 – April 20, 1973) was an American film producer and cinematographer of short films. He won at the 7th Academy Awards along with his brother Stacy Woodard for the category of Best Live Action Short-Novelty, for the film City of Wax.

Filmography
With the exception of Monsieur Fabre these are all short films.

Monsieur Fabre (1951) (Cinematographer)
The Negro Soldier (1945) (Cinematographer) (credited as Capt. Horace Woodard)
Adventures of Chico (1938) (Cinematographer, producer, editor and director)
Neptune Mysteries: The Struggle to Live Series (1935) (Cinematographer and writer)
Fang and Claw (1935) (Editor)
Born to Die (1934) (Producer)
City of Wax (1934) (Producer)

References

External links

American film producers
American cinematographers
Artists from Salt Lake City
1904 births
1973 deaths
Producers who won the Live Action Short Film Academy Award
20th-century American businesspeople